Enixotrophon is a genus of sea snails, marine gastropod mollusks in the subfamily Pagodulinae of the family Muricidae, the murex snails or rock snails.

Species
Species within the genus Enixotrophon include:
 Enixotrophon acceptans (Barnard, 1959)
 Enixotrophon araios (Houart & Engl, 2007)
 Enixotrophon arnaudi (Pastorino, 2002)
 Enixotrophon atanua (Houart & Tröndle, 2008)
 Enixotrophon carduelis (R. B. Watson, 1882)
 Enixotrophon ceciliae (Houart, 2003)
 Enixotrophon columbarioides (Pastorino & Scarabino, 2008)
 Enixotrophon concepcionensis (Houart & Sellanes, 2006)
 Enixotrophon condei (Houart, 2003)
 Enixotrophon cuspidarioides (Powell, 1951)
 Enixotrophon declinans (R. B. Watson, 1882)
 † Enixotrophon delli (Beu, 1967) 
 Enixotrophon emilyae (Pastorino, 2002)
 Enixotrophon eos (B. A. Marshall & Houart, 2011)
 Enixotrophon eumorphus (B. A. Marshall & Houart, 2011)
 Enixotrophon fasciolarioides (Pastorino & Scarabino, 2008)
 Enixotrophon hastulus (B. A. Marshall & Houart, 2011)
 Enixotrophon johannthielei (Barnard, 1959)
 Enixotrophon kosunorum (Houart & Lan, 2003)
 Enixotrophon latus (B. A. Marshall & Houart, 2011)
 Enixotrophon lochi (B. A. Marshall & Houart, 2011)
 Enixotrophon macquariensis (Powell, 1957)
 Enixotrophon maxwelli (B. A. Marshall & Houart, 2011)
 Enixotrophon multigradus (Houart, 1990)
 Enixotrophon obtuseliratus (Schepman, 1911)
 Enixotrophon obtusus (B. A. Marshall & Houart, 2011)
 Enixotrophon occiduus (B. A. Marshall & Houart, 2011)
 Enixotrophon planispinus (E. A. Smith, 1906)
 Enixotrophon plicilaminatus (Verco, 1909)
 Enixotrophon poirieria (Powell, 1951)
 Enixotrophon procerus (Houart, 2001)
 Enixotrophon pulchellus (Schepman, 1911)
 Enixotrophon pygmaeus (B. A. Marshall & Houart, 2011)
 Enixotrophon sansibaricus (Thiele, 1925)
 Enixotrophon siberutensis (Thiele, 1925)
 Enixotrophon similidroueti (Houart, 1989)
 Enixotrophon tangaroa (B. A. Marshall & Houart, 2011)
 Enixotrophon tenuirostratus (E. A. Smith, 1899)
 Enixotrophon vangoethemi (Houart, 2003)
 Enixotrophon venustus (B. A. Marshall & Houart, 2011)
 Enixotrophon veronicae (Pastorino, 1999)
 Enixotrophon ziczac (Tiba, 1981)

References

 Houart, R. & Tröndle, J., 2008. Update of Muricidae (excluding Coralliophilinae) from French Polynesia with description of ten new species. Novapex 9(2-3): 53-93
 Houart R. & Héros V. (2016). New species and records of deep water muricids (Gastropoda: Muricidae) from Papua New Guinea. Vita Malacologica. 15: 7-34. [

External links
 Barco, A.; Marshall, B.; Houart, R.; Oliverio, M. (2015). Molecular phylogenetics of Haustrinae and Pagodulinae (Neogastropoda: Muricidae) with a focus on New Zealand species. Journal of Molluscan Studies. 81(4): 476-488

 
Pagodulinae